Kecerovce is a village and municipality in Košice-okolie District in the Kosice Region of eastern Slovakia.

History
Historically, the village was first mentioned in 1567.

Geography
The village lies at an altitude of 310 metres and covers an area of 13.806 km².
It has a population of about 2585 people.

Construction of a nuclear power plant is planned in Kecerovce. Slovak government announced that initiation of the construction will depend on success in postponing of closure of the oldest Slovak nuclear plant in Jaslovské Bohunice.

Genealogical resources

The records for genealogical research are available at the state archive "Statny Archiv in Kosice, Slovakia"

 Roman Catholic church records (births/marriages/deaths): 1755-1895 (parish A)
 Greek Catholic church records (births/marriages/deaths): 1773-1895 (parish B)
 Lutheran church records (births/marriages/deaths): 1784-1895 (parish B)
 Jewish cemetery records also exist

See also
 List of municipalities and towns in Slovakia

External links

Surnames of living people in Kecerovce

Villages and municipalities in Košice-okolie District
Šariš
Romani communities in Slovakia